This is a list of regions in the U.S. state of Oregon.

List

See also
 List of ecoregions in Oregon
 List of regions of the United States

References

 
Oregon geography-related lists